The 1982 Air Canada Cup was Canada's fourth annual national midget 'AAA' hockey championship, which was played April 13 – 18, 1982 at the Memorial Arena in Victoria, British Columbia.  The Burnaby Winter Club Travellers defeated the Gouverneurs de Ste-Foy, who were led by future Hall of Famer Patrick Roy in goal, to win the gold medal.  The bronze medal game between the Cape Breton Colonels and the South Ottawa Warriors ended in a 5-5 tie.  Burnaby's Cliff Ronning led the tournament in scoring and was named Most Valuable Player.

Aside from Ronning and Roy, other future National Hockey League players competing were Wendel Clark, Sylvain Côté Russ Courtnall, Tony Hrkac, Grant Jennings, Bob Joyce, and Mike Millar.

Teams

Round robin

DC8 Flight

Standings

Scores

Notre Dame 6 - Edmonton 1
St. Boniface 3 - St. Catharines 3
Ste-Foy 10 - Cape Breton 0
Cape Breton 4 - St. Boniface 2
Ste- Foy 3 - Edmonton 2
Notre Dame 4 - St. Catharines 1
Ste-Foy 6 - St. Boniface 3
St. Catharines 5 - Edmonton 5
Notre Dame 6 - Cape Breton 5
Cape Breton 4 - Edmonton 3
St. Boniface 4 - Edmonton 3
Ste- Foy 4 - Notre Dame 1
Edmonton 6 - Cape Breton 3
Notre Dame 3 - St. Boniface 2
St. Catharines 3 - Ste-Foy 2

DC9 Flight

Standings

Scores

Andrews 9 - Fredericton 3
South Ottawa 6 - Sherwood-Parkdale 1
Burnaby 7 - Corner Brook 0
South Ottawa 3 - Andrews 0
Corner Brook 3 - Fredericton 1
Burnaby 7 - Sherwood-Parkdale 5
Sherwood-Parkdale 9 - Fredericton 2
Andrews 6 - Corner Brook 2
Burnaby 4 - South Ottawa 2
South Ottawa 8 - Corner Brook 0
Andrews 7 - Sherwood-Parkdale 5
Burnaby 6 - Fredericton 2
Corner Brook 3 - Sherwood-Parkdale 2
South Ottawa 3 - Fredericton 2
Burnaby 7 - Andrews 2

Playoffs

Quarter-finals
Burnaby 7 - Corner Brook 1
Cape Breton 2 - Notre Dame 1
South Ottawa 6 - Andrews 3
Ste-Foy 7 - St. Catharines 4

Semi-finals
Burnaby 4 - Cape Breton 3 (OT)
Ste-Foy 4 - South Ottawa 2

Bronze-medal game
Cape Breton 5 - South Ottawa 5 (OT)

Gold-medal game
Burnaby 3 - Ste-Foy 1

Individual awards
Most Valuable Player: Cliff Ronning (Burnaby)
Top Scorer: Cliff Ronning (Burnaby)
Top Forward: Martin Bouliane (Ste-Foy)
Top Defenceman: Sylvain Côté (Ste-Foy)
Top Goaltender:  Marc Robillard (South Ottawa)
Most Sportsmanlike Player: Steve Dunne (Corner Brook)

See also
Telus Cup

References

External links
Telus Cup Website
Hockey Canada-Telus Cup Guide and Record Book

Telus Cup
Air Canada Cup
Sports competitions in Victoria, British Columbia
Air Canada Cup